George Morgan and Mate Pavić were the defending champions but were no longer eligible to compete as Juniors.

Andrew Harris and Nick Kyrgios defeated Matteo Donati and Pietro Licciardi in the final, 6–2, 6–4 to win the boys' doubles tennis title at the 2012 Wimbledon Championships.

Seeds

  Filip Peliwo /  Gianluigi Quinzi (quarterfinals)
  Liam Broady /  Joshua Ward-Hibbert (second round)
  Julien Cagnina /  Mitchell Krueger (first round, withdrew)
  Andrew Harris /  Nick Kyrgios (champions)
  Luke Saville /  Jordan Thompson (quarterfinals)
  Juan Ignacio Galarza /  Mateo Nicolás Martínez (semifinals)
  Kyle Edmund /  Stefano Napolitano (first round)
  Mackenzie McDonald /  Spencer Papa (second round)

Draw

Finals

Top half

Bottom half

References

External links

Boys' Doubles
Wimbledon Championship by year – Boys' doubles